Creating Can I Get a Witness? The Gospel of James Baldwin is a 2016 musical theatrical tribute to writer James Baldwin created by musician Meshell Ndegeocello, it debuted in December 2016 at the Harlem Stage in Harlem, New York.

The 2016 world premiere of the show was directed by Charlotte Brathwaite.

Overview
The piece is inspired by James Baldwin's book The Fire Next Time and presents it as a church service.

References

External links
Charlottebrathwaite.com - Can I Get a Witness?
The Harlem Times article

2016 musicals

African-American theatre
American musicals
Musicals based on books
Plays about religion and science